César Rodríguez-Garavito (born in Colombia, 1971) is an international human rights and environmental law scholar and practitioner. He is a Professor of Clinical Law and Chair of the Center for Human Rights and Global Justice at New York University School of Law. Rodríguez-Garavito is the founding director of the Earth Rights Advocacy Clinic, the Climate Litigation Accelerator, and the Future of Human Rights Practicum at NYU Law. He is also the editor-in-chief of Open Global Rights, a leading online opinion portal in the human rights field.

A lawyer and sociologist by training, Rodríguez-Garavito is the author of numerous books and articles on climate change litigation, the human rights movement, socio-environmental conflicts, Indigenous rights, and business and human rights. He has served as an Adjunct Judge of the Constitutional Court of Colombia, an expert witness of the Inter-American Court of Human Rights, and a litigator in prominent climate change, Indigenous rights, and socioeconomic rights cases. He is also a member of the Science Panel for the Amazon, an expert group of distinguished scientists, Indigenous leaders, scholars, and others that assesses the state of the Amazon and issues evidence-based findings and recommendations.

Education
He holds a Ph.D. and an M.S. (Sociology) from the University of Wisconsin-Madison, an M.A. from NYU’s Institute for Law and Society, an M.A. (Philosophy) from the National University of Colombia, and a J.D. from the University of los Andes.

Academic Career
Rodríguez-Garavito is currently a Professor of Clinical Law and Chair of the Center for Human Rights and Global Justice at New York University School of Law. Rodríguez-Garavito is the founding director of the Earth Rights Advocacy program, the Climate Litigation Accelerator, and the Future of Human Rights Practicum at NYU Law. He is also a Faculty Associate at the Berkman Klein Center for Internet & Society at Harvard University. 

Rodríguez-Garavito has held a range of teaching positions, including appointments as a visiting professor at Stanford Law School, Brown University, the University of Melbourne, the University of Pretoria, and the Getulio Vargas Foundation (Brazil). He has, moreover, served as cofounder and director of Dejusticia, as well as an associate professor of law and director of the Center for Socio-Legal Research and the Global Justice and Human Rights Program at the University of the Andes (Colombia). 

Rodríguez-Garavito is co-editor of Cambridge University Press’s Globalization and Human Rights book series. He has served on the editorial boards of the Annual Review of Law and Social Science and the Business and Human Rights Journal, as well as on the boards of the University Network for Human Rights, Columbia University’s Center on Sustainable Investment, the Business and Human Rights Resource Center, and WITNESS.

Selected bibliography
Litigating the Climate Emergency: How Human Rights, Courts, and Legal Mobilization Can Bolster Climate Action(Cambridge University Press)
Human Rights 2030: Existential Challenges and a New Paradigm for the Field,” in N. Bhuta et al. (eds). The Struggle for Human Rights (Oxford University Press).
Climatizing Human Rights: Economic and Social Rights for the Anthropocene,” in M. Langford & K. Young (eds.) Oxford Handbook of Economic and Social Rights (OUP)
The Globalization of the Vernacular: Mobilizing, Resisting, and Transforming International Human Rights from Below,” in P. Alston, ed. Essays in Honor of Sally Merry (OUP)
A Human Right to a Healthy Environment? Moral, Legal and Empirical Considerations,” in J. Knox and Ramin Pejan, The Human Right to a Healthy Environment (CUP)
Reframing Indigenous Rights: The Right to Consultation and the Rights of Nature and Future Generations in the Sarayaku Legal Mobilization,” (with C. Baquero) in G. de Burca, Legal Mobilization for Human Rights (OUP).

References

External links
 César Rodríguez Garavito on KCRW
Center for Human Rights and Global Justice
 OpenGlobalRights

Living people
University of Wisconsin–Madison College of Letters and Science alumni
National University of Colombia alumni
Environmental lawyers
New York University School of Law faculty
University of Los Andes (Colombia) alumni
1971 births